Darjazin (also Romanized as Darjazīn; also known as Daragazin and Darzazin) is a city in the Central District of Mehdishahr County, Semnan Province, Iran. At the 2006 census, its population was 4,370, in 1,108 families.

References

Populated places in Mehdishahr County

Cities in Semnan Province